Lillian Gish in a Liberty Loan Appeal is a 1918 American silent short film directed by D. W. Griffith. Produced to support the Liberty bond drive of 1918, the film is now considered to be a lost film.

Plot
Lillian wants to buy clothes but her mother suggests it would be more patriotic to invest in Liberty bonds.  While asleep Lillian dreams of German war atrocities and awakens determined to buy bonds instead of clothes.

Cast
 Lillian Gish
 Kate Bruce
 Carol Dempster
 George Fawcett

References

External links

1918 films
Films directed by D. W. Griffith
1918 short films
American silent short films
American black-and-white films
Lost American films
Lillian Gish
1918 lost films
1910s American films